ESAM or Esam may refer to:
ESAM (gene)
Esam (given name)
John Esam, performer at the International Poetry Incarnation, 1965
Mons Esam, mountain on the moon 
Empire State Aerosciences Museum, in Glenville, New York, United States
Enfants Solidaires d'Afrique et du Monde, African anti-trafficking group
Superior School of Agronomy of Mossoró (ESAM), former name of the Federal Rural University of the Semi-arid Region, Brazil